Eldo "Dick" Garrett (born January 31, 1947) is a retired American professional basketball player.

Career
A 6'3" guard from Southern Illinois University, Garrett was selected by the Los Angeles Lakers with the 27th overall pick of the 1969 NBA draft. He played five seasons (1969–1974) in the National Basketball Association, one with the Lakers, three with the Buffalo Braves, and his final season that he split between the New York Knicks and the Milwaukee Bucks. He earned NBA All-Rookie Team honors during the 1969–70 NBA season after averaging 11.6 points per game for the Lakers.

NBA career statistics

Regular season

|-
| align="left" | 1969–70
| align="left" | Los Angeles
| 73 || - || 31.8 || .434 || - || .852 || 3.2 || 2.5 || - || - || 11.6
|-
| align="left" | 1970–71
| align="left" | Buffalo
| 75 || - || 31.7 || .414 || - || .869 || 3.9 || 3.5 || - || - || 12.9
|-
| align="left" | 1971–72
| align="left" | Buffalo
| 73 || - || 26.1 || .442 || - || .866 || 3.1 || 2.3 || - || - || 10.8
|-
| align="left" | 1972–73
| align="left" | Buffalo
| 78 || - || 23.1 || .419 || - || .873 || 2.7 || 2.8 || - || - || 10.0
|-
| align="left" | 1973–74
| align="left" | New York
| 25 || - || 9.6 || .352 || - || .769 || 1.0 || 0.6 || 0.3 || 0.0 || 3.0
|-
| align="left" | 1973–74
| align="left" | Milwaukee
| 15 || - || 5.8 || .314 || - || .833 || 0.9 || 0.6 || 0.2 || 0.0 || 1.8
|- class="sortbottom"
| style="text-align:center;" colspan="2"| Career
| 339 || - || 25.7 || .423 || - || .863 || 3.0 || 2.5 || 0.3 || 0.0 || 10.3
|}

Playoffs

|-
| align="left" | 1969–70
| align="left" | Los Angeles
| 18 || - || 33.1 || .510 || - || .875 || 2.9 || 2.2 || - || - || 12.8
|-
| align="left" | 1973–74
| align="left" | Milwaukee
| 8 || - || 5.8 || .286 || - || .500 || 0.4 || 0.9 || 0.3 || 0.0 || 0.8
|- class="sortbottom"
| style="text-align:center;" colspan="2"| Career
| 26 || - || 24.7 || .502 || - || .833 || 2.1 || 1.8 || 0.3 || 0.0 || 9.1
|}

Personal life
Following his NBA career, Garrett worked for Miller Brewing Company as an account representative, and as a security guard at Milwaukee Bucks home games.

His son Diante Garrett has played for the Phoenix Suns and the Utah Jazz. His son Damon played basketball at UW-Whitewater. His daughter Jermia died from a severe asthma attack.

References

External links

1947 births
Living people
American men's basketball players
Basketball players from Illinois
Buffalo Braves expansion draft picks
Buffalo Braves players
Guards (basketball)
Los Angeles Lakers draft picks
Los Angeles Lakers players
Milwaukee Bucks players
New York Knicks players
Southern Illinois Salukis men's basketball players